Taibon Agordino is a comune (municipality) in the province of Belluno in the Italian region of Veneto, located about  north of Venice and about  northwest of Belluno.

Many of the homes in Taibon have descended within families. It is common for younger generations to move out of the valley to a larger city for the purpose of building a career and subsequently return for retirement. Taibon was once populated by homesteaders who were self-sufficient, making their own dairy products, sausage, and polenta as their source of carbohydrates. Today these family homes are treasured because of the family history they represent, but also because they are adjacent to some of the best trekking, skiing, and road cycling in the world.

Taibon Agordino borders the following municipalities: Agordo, Alleghe, Canale d'Agordo, Cencenighe Agordino, Gosaldo, San Tomaso Agordino, Tonadico, Voltago Agordino, Zoldo Alto.

Points of interest 
 Giardino Alpino "Antonio Segni", an alpine botanical garden
 Bar Savio, a local bar: this bar, as most in Italy, serves cappuccino, various wines and beers.
 Taibon has three bars including the one mentioned above, a clothing store, and a bike shop.

Today's economy in Taibon is based on tourism in the Dolomite mountains and the Luxottica plant located in nearby Agordo. This eyeglass fabrication facility employs 3,500 people, making glasses under brand names such as Costa Del Mar, Ray Ban, Persol, and Oakley.

Demographic evolution

References 

Cities and towns in Veneto